Treasure Box for Boys and Girls – The Complete Sessions 1991–1999 is a compilation boxset from the Irish band The Cranberries. It is a collection of the complete sessions releases of their first four albums.

Track listing
Disc 1 – Everybody Else Is Doing It, So Why Can't We?

Disc 2 – No Need to Argue

Disc 3 – To the Faithful Departed

Disc 4 – Bury the Hatchet

References

The Cranberries compilation albums
Albums produced by Stephen Street
Albums produced by Bruce Fairbairn
2002 compilation albums
Island Records compilation albums